The Berkeley Adult School is administered by the Berkeley Unified School District.  The school is located at 1701 San Pablo Avenue, between Virginia and Francisco Streets in Berkeley, California.

The Berkeley Adult School began in 1922 as the Berkeley Evening School and was located at Berkeley High School, with adjunct Evening Trade Schools located at Burbank Junior High and Edison Junior High.  It was subsequently relocated at McKinley/East Campus by the 1960s, moving with East Campus to the former Savo Island federal housing site in 1971.  The school was entirely relocated to West Campus, Berkeley High School (formerly Burbank Junior High) after that school was closed.  In 2004, the school was again relocated to its current location at the former site of Franklin Elementary School, which is also the site of the first and oldest public school (established 1856) in Berkeley.

External links
 Berkeley Adult School website

Education in Berkeley, California
California Adult Schools
1922 establishments in California